Saddam Hussein (1937–2006) was an Iraqi politician, the 5th President of Iraq.

Saddam may refer to:

Saddam (name), an Arabic given name
Saddam Beach, a village in India
Saddam: The Secret Life, a biographical book about Saddam Hussein
Sadr City, a district of Baghdad, named "Saddam City" from 1983–2003
Baghdad International Airport, named "Saddam International Airport" from 1979–2003
Al-Nahrain University in Baghdad, named "Saddam University" from 1986–2003
Mosul Dam, formerly named Saddam Dam

See also
Shaddam